Kedemoth was a city of Reuben, assigned to the Levites of the family of Merari. It lay not far north-east of Dibon-gad, east of the Dead Sea.

Levitical cities
Tribe of Reuben